Lira District is a district in Northern Uganda. Like many other Ugandan districts, it is named after its 'chief town', Lira.

Location

Lira District is bordered by Pader District to the north, Otuke District to the northeast, Alebtong District to the east, Dokolo District to the southeast, Apac District to the southwest and Kole District to the west. The coordinates of the district are: 2° 16' 26" N / 32° 57' 11" E.

Overview
Until 2005, the district comprised six counties; Erute, Dokolo, Kyoga, Otuke, Moroto and Lira Municipality. These were further subdivided into 28 sub-counties. Of the 28 sub-counties, four are Municipal Divisions. There are a total of 192 parishes with 2,247 villages. With Dokolo becoming a district in 2005, Alebtong and Otuke in 2010, Lira District now consists of three counties: Erute North County, Erute South County and Lira Municipality.

Conflict and displacement
Long untouched by the Lord's Resistance Army insurgency that ravaged Kitgum and Pader Districts to the north, the increased violence of 2002 resulted in massive population displacement within the district of Lira. However, as of June 2009, the security situation in the district was relatively peaceful. In 2006 and 2007, Lira District experienced a massive return of Internally Displaced Persons.  Over 310,000 of the estimated 350,000 left camps to return to their home villages in a period of 14 months.

Lango sub-region
Lira District is part of Lango sub-region, which consists of the following districts: Alebtong, Amolatar, Apac, Dokolo, Lira, Kole, Otuke and Oyam. The sub-region is coterminous with the now defunct Lango District. Lango sub-region was home to an estimated 1.5 million Langi in 2002, according to the national census conducted at that time.

Population
In 1991, the Uganda national population census estimated the population in the district at about 191,500. Eleven years later, the 2002 national population census, put the district population at about 290,600, with an annual population growth rate of 3.4%. In 2012, the population of Lira District was estimated at about 403,100. The majority of the population are ethnic Lango and the predominant language spoken is Lango.

Economic activity
Lira District has a diversified economy including:

 Grain Milling
 Wholesale and retail sales
 Leisure industry
 Brick making
 Pottery
 Roof tile making
 Carpentry
 Logging
 Construction
 Fishing
 Embroidery
 Crop processing & marketing
 Metal repairs & fabrication
 Printing services
 Bookshop business
 Boda-boda business
 Pharmaceutical sales

See also
 Lango sub-region
 Northern Region, Uganda

References

External links

Lira District Website

 
Lango sub-region
Districts of Uganda
Northern Region, Uganda